Emile Benoit (born 1965) is the pseudonym for the American author of the critically acclaimed Essays and Aphorisms on the Higher Man,  Beasts in Eden, and The Artistic Perspective, ref. as well as the full-length play A Midsummer Night's Hangover. He holds both B.A. and M.A. degrees in philosophy from San Diego State University. He currently lives in California with his wife and two daughters.

Works

Essays and Aphorisms on the Higher Man

History has shown examples of man trying to pull himself out of his ignorant bliss and stagnancy, from the philosopher kings and Renaissance man to Nietzsche's Superman. A scant number of individuals have dared to become something more by the unremitting quest for knowledge gained from the arts, religion, philosophy, etc., and the implementation of this knowledge across the broad spectrum of their lives and the lives of others…[H]umanity can go beyond Kant, Hume, Nietzsche's Superman, and the selfishness of Sartre's existential humanism. In a sense, he or she can become a "higher man." Benoit writes, "The evolution of the species will be when man can incorporate and digest all of his religions and live wholly, honestly and peacefully with himself and others…when he accepts all the religions, arts, and sciences as expressions of human greatness; a time when even the truth will no longer be an eternal proposition but simply an expression of mankind's prominence at making the incomprehensible understood – if but only briefly." As Benoit writes in the preface of the book, his intention is "to inspire, rather than impose, to incite rather than allow man to settle into a comfortable repose, delighted with himself."
The book has won critical acclaim from New York Times-bestselling authors.

A Midsummer Night's Hangover and Heaven

In A Midsummer Night's Hangover, two young lovers must overcome the religious rigidity of the girl's father in order to be together. Inevitably, they must escape to the woods, fake their own deaths, and summon the devil himself for assistance. Midsummer is a darkly lyrical and comic world inhabited by lonely dreamers, vengeful lovers, rabid feminists, assorted potions, and a statue that springs to life. As a complement to the full-length play, Heaven is a comedic one act that imagines a crisis in heaven wherein God Himself is suffering from a creative block and must assemble the great artists of Hell to join Him in Heaven for inspiration. What ensues is a gentle and quirky satire on religion, love, and friendship. These two comedies are both poetic, playful, and irreverent pieces that provide for some thoughtful and comical insight into the human condition.

The Artistic Perspective
One of the underlying themes of The Artistic Perspective is related to the cultivation of human character. It is a "theme" and not a "thesis" precisely because this work does not provide arguments in the traditional manner. Instead, the book offers a form of reasoning that is primarily artistic rather than theoretical in design, although there are certainly plenty of philosophical notions in the book itself. The paragraphs or stanzas of each chapter stand alone as impressionistic insights into the human condition, aphoristic in style and construction. Yet, these smaller pieces then are woven into the fabric of the larger ideas of each individual chapter. The chapters, too, are then stitched together to suggest some of the themes of the book as a whole. The pointillism of Georges Seurat might help illustrate this idea. Seurat painted on a huge canvas which he imbued with small, distinctive dots of pure color applied in certain patterns to form a larger image. So, if a man examines one of Seurat's paintings up close, he will see nothing but an odd collection of colorful blobs on the canvas. However, if the same man were to step away from the painting to view it from a distance, perhaps ruminate on it awhile, he would notice the formation of recognizable images. This book is intended to be read in a similar manner, closely at first and then from something of a distance.

Beasts in Eden: The Humane and the Inhumane
This book is as much a work or art as it is philosophy.  The piece meditates on the two personalities of the human character: the humane and the inhumane, and our own responsibility to nurture the one while we contend with the other. On the one hand we all possess the capacity to do great things with our lives. For example, we can be virtuous and kind and tolerant and compassionate and thoughtful. Yet within the same human personality also resides the character of the inhumane which expresses itself in cruelty, selfishness, brutality, indifference, egotism, ignorance and a whole host of other repugnant features. According to Benoit, it is art which helps bridge the chasm between the inhumane and the humane. The exposure to art eventually serves to tame the beastly aspects of our nature and leads us to a perspective more profound and meaningful.

Personal life
Emile worked professionally as an actor for ten years. He married the prominent California attorney Laura Arnold in 2000 and is the father of two daughters, Miranda and Brady.

References

External links 
Benoit's website

1965 births
American male writers
Existentialists
20th-century American philosophers
Living people
San Diego State University alumni
20th-century pseudonymous writers